Torbjørn Gasbjerg (born 21 August 1980) is a Danish mountain bike orienteering competitor and World Champion. He won an individual gold medal at the 2007 World MTB Orienteering Championships, a gold medal in the relay in 2008, and a gold medal in the middle distance in 2009.

References

External links
 

Danish orienteers
Male orienteers
Danish male cyclists
Mountain bike orienteers
1980 births
Living people
Place of birth missing (living people)